George Farrell (born 14 August 1964 in St Albans) is a British bobsledder who competed in the early 1990s. Competing in two Winter Olympics, he earned his best finish of fifth in the four-man event at Lillehammer in 1994.

References

 1992 bobsleigh two-man results at Todor66.com
 1992 bobsleigh four-man results at Todor66.com
 1994 bobsleigh four-man results at Todor66.com

External links
 
 
 

1964 births
Living people
British male bobsledders
Olympic bobsledders of Great Britain
Bobsledders at the 1992 Winter Olympics
Bobsledders at the 1994 Winter Olympics
Sportspeople from St Albans